The Waikawau River is the name of two rivers on the Coromandel Peninsula in New Zealand's North Island, which each have nearby settlements called Waikawau. The more southerly flows generally west from its sources in the Coromandel Range, reaching the Firth of Thames at Waikawau Beach. This river flows south east off the Moehau Range to join the Pacific in Waikawau Bay. Both rivers were officially named on 21 June 2019.

Waikawau River has 69% of its catchment in forest and scrub. Fish in the river include giant kōkopu, long and shortfin eels (tuna), giant bully (tītarakura), common bully (toitoi), redfin bully, torrentfish (panoko), smelt (pōrohe), īnanga, koura, trout and shrimp. Since 2006 work has been done to enhance  of wetlands and saltmarsh in the estuary, to increase bittern (matuku hūrepo), spotless crake (pūweto), banded rail (moho-pererū), fernbird (kōtātā) and pateke. 98 plant species have also been identified in the reserve, which is part of the  Waikawau Bay Farm Park. A campsite is at the eastern end of the bay, established in 1929.

See also 

 List of rivers of New Zealand

References 

Thames-Coromandel District
Rivers of Waikato
Rivers of New Zealand